Rainbow Court was a historic hotel complex located at Myrtle Beach in Horry County, South Carolina. The complex of buildings ranged in dates of construction from 1935 to 1959.  The complex included: two motel-type buildings, five beach cottages/boarding houses, and a small house. The buildings were situated around an open court with a swimming pool. There were six contributing buildings. It was one of the few remaining examples of the small-scale, low-rise motels that pre-dated Hurricane Hazel (1954).

It was listed on the National Register of Historic Places in 1996 but was delisted in 2020.

With development planned for the area, including a parking garage and police station at the Rainbow Court location, demolition was planned as of June 2016. Several area motels were abandoned and attracting vagrants. The city and the Myrtle Beach Downtown Redevelopment Corporation had made $10 million available for improvements.

See also
 List of hotels
 List of motels

References

External links
Rainbow Court - Myrtle Beach, South Carolina - U.S. National Register of Historic Places on Waymarking.com

Hotel buildings on the National Register of Historic Places in South Carolina
Hotel buildings completed in 1935
Hotels established in 1935
Buildings and structures in Myrtle Beach, South Carolina
1935 establishments in South Carolina
National Register of Historic Places in Horry County, South Carolina
Motels in the United States
Former National Register of Historic Places in South Carolina